Jahu (also Jahu Bhoranj, and Jahu Hamirpur) is a village panchayat, of Bhoranj block, Bhoranj tehsil, of the Hamirpur district of Himachal Pradesh, in India. Hamirpur is one of twelve districts in Himachal Pradesh. Pin Code of Jahu Village is 176 048 and People of Jahu Village use Hindi and Pahadi Language for communication.

Jahu is on a "triple border" of Hamirpur, Bilaspur and Mandi districts. Jahu is the last village of Hamirpur district that connects Hamirpur district to Bilaspur and Mandi districts.

Economy

Agriculture is the major economic driver of Jahu, however people are included in manufacturing and various trading businesses as well. Fishing is also an economy driver of Jahu.

The area, nearby cities

Jahu is itself an emerging small town. The nearest major city is Sarkaghat.

To the north  is Palampur.

Nearby tehsils

Severals tehsils are near Jahu. To the west is  Hamirpur Tehsil, and to the south Ghumarwin, to the south east Baldwara Tehsil, and to the south is Bijhri Tehsil, and to the north are Bamson Tehsil and Dharampur Tehsil.

People from Jahu

Kangana Ranaut, a Bollywood actress, did her primary education in Bhambla near Jahu.

The Area

Jahu is near Gobind Sagar, a reservoir on the Sutlej river, which flows south of town. The Beas Satluj Link Project is northeast, as is Prashar Lake.

The confluence of the Sunail Khad and the Seer Khad is just south of Jahu. The Sunail Khad flows west of Jahu. The Seer Khad flows into the Sutlej.

The source of the Beas River is just west.

Access to and from

Jahu has bus service. The nearest railways station is Nangal Dam railway station, near Nangal in Punjab, also near Bhakra Dam. The nearest airport is Bhuntar Airport. Buses are also available at specific timings to major cities like Dharamshala, Shimla, Chandigarh and Manali .

Other information

People of Jahu greet very nicely. They are good and helpful. Jahu has also well developed infrastructure but during the  Flood in 2014, a bridge on the Seer Khad collapsed,  and three people were washed downstream.

References

Villages in Hamirpur district, Himachal Pradesh